Fourth Generation Head: Tatsuyuki Oyamato(四代目・大和辰之) is Boys' love manga/comic book written and illustrated by a Japanese manga artist Beriko Scarlet. It is Scarlet's third published comic, and also the sequel to Minori's Hand and prequel to Jealousy.

Plot

Tatsuyuki Oyamato, a son of the Yakuza boss Akitora Oyamato and an heir to Oyamato Family in Tokyo, is reluctant to carry on his family legacy and responsibilities. He also starts questioning his sexuality after his "sessions" with Minori, a chiropractor with special "methods" to relax his clients. Being heartbroken by Minori's sudden disappearance, Tatsuyuki is sent to manage the family's small start-up branch in Fukuoka and to clean up his act. One night, he encounters with Nozomi, whom he had met when they were kids. While their relationship starts blossoming, reckless Tatsuyuki falls into the hands of Uichi Rogi, a mysterious man who has a past with Tatsuyuki's father.

Characters

Tatsuyuki Oyamato (大和辰之)

A spoiled son of Akitora Oyamato, a big boss of Oyamato Family. Tatsuyuki was first introduced to the audience in Beriko's previous comic, Give Me a Hand. Tatsuyuki's journey begins when his love interest Minori disappears after being reunited with his long lost ex boyfriend. Depressed and heartbroken, Tatsuyuki is sent to manage the Fukuoka branch, then meets Nozomi, whom he had met when they were kids.

Nozomi Koga (小鹿望)

A tall handsome kindergarten teacher who has a past of being sexually abused by his father when he was a kid. He fell in love with Tatsuyuki when they first met, and was later revealed that he has been secretly stalking Tatsuyuki for years.

Uichi Rogi (櫓木卯一)

A money lender in Fukuoka. He has a history with Tatsuyuki's dad, Akitora, and has been pursuing him to come to Fukuoka by any means possible. Uichi later becomes the leading role of Beriko's latest comic, Jealousy.

Asoda (浅生田)

A right hand man of Akitora Oyamato. Asoda raised Tatsuyuki like his own son after his biological mother passed when Tatsuyuki was only eight. He loves Tatsuyuki dearly but regrets he has spoiled him. He also becomes one of the main characters in Jealousy.

Reika Rogi (櫓木麗華)

Uichi Rogi's daughter who goes to the kindergarten Nozomi works for. She is a little kid with very mature demeanors. She also has a recurrent role in Jealousy.

Media

Manga

Originally published in Japan in 2015, the book has been widely translated and published in many countries, including Taiwan, South Korea, the United States, Germany, France and Portugal.

In 2019, Tatsuyuki Oyamato Premium Collection (四代目・大和辰之 プレミアム・コレクション もつ鍋とリーゼント MTR) was published in Japan, then subsequently in Taiwan, South Korea, Portugal and France after the comic's huge success and popular demands from devoted fans. The book includes the newly published original comics, color illustrations, and very rare in-depth long interview with the author.

The short comic, Sweet Flavor (アマイ・フレイバー), which was previously only available with the purchase of the Drama CD, is also included in 四代目・大和辰之 プレミアム・コレクション もつ鍋とリーゼント MTR.

Drama CD

Following the success of the comic book, the drama CD was released on March 18, 2016 in Japan.  It included the original 16 page comic, Sweet Flavor (アマイ・フレイバー). The short drama CD with the same title was also sold with BL Magazine, Cheri+ Volume 21 in July 2016. These 2 items became the collectors’ items and traded on the auction sites with high prices.

The short comic, Sweet Flavor (アマイ・フレイバー), was later included in  四代目・大和辰之 プレミアム・コレクション もつ鍋とリーゼント MTR.

Reception, Awards and Rankings

Beriko’s style was groundbreaking to both old/new BL fans and Fourth Generation Head: Tatsuyuki Oyamato became an instant classic, and it gained the recognition from all over the world. When it was initially released as the digital comic on online outlets, it became one of the best sellers of all time in BL genre. Readers were mesmerized by its exciting story line, attractive characters, and Beriko’s beautiful illustrations.

Fourth Generation Head: Tatsuyuki Oyamato was successful critically and commercially, and received many awards, including the prestige annual BL Award on the Japan's most famous Boys' love website ちるちる.

 These BL Comics Are Too Hot! 2016 (このBLがやばい2016)
Ranked #5 Fourth Generation Head: Tatsuyuki Oyamato

 Chiru Chiru BL AWARDS 2016 (ChiruChiru　第七回ＢＬアワード ランキング)

 The Best Comics: Ranked #6 Fourth Generation Head: Tatsuyuki Oyamato

 The Best Bottom: Ranked #2 Tatsuyuki Oyamato

 The Most Erotic Character: Ranked #5 Tatsuyuki Oyamato

 The Best Top: Ranked #11 Nozomi Koga

 30 Ultimate BL Comics 2018 (腐女子・不朽の名作30選 2018)
Ranked #10 Fourth Generation Head: Tatsuyuki Oyamato

 30 Ultimate BL Comics 2019 (腐女子・不朽の名作2019 コミックス編)
Ranked #17 Fourth Generation Head: Tatsuyuki Oyamato

 Renta! #1 Best Selling BL Comics of The First Half Year in 2015 (Renta!2015年上半期人気漫画作品)
Fourth Generation Head: Tatsuyuki Oyamato

References 

Yaoi anime and manga